Brian Christopher (born June 16, 1987), of Springfield, Pennsylvania, was an All American lacrosse player for Johns Hopkins University in Division I college lacrosse.

Christopher played for the Blue Jays from 2006 to 2009 helping the team to an NCAA Championship in 2007, an NCAA Finals in 2008, and was named third team All American.

Over the Blue Jays final four games in 2009 Christopher scored the game winning overtime goals in three of those games including Hopkins' 2009 quarterfinal overtime 12-11 win over Brown.

The Denver Outlaws selected Christopher with the fourteenth pick of the 2009 MLL draft. He was subsequently picked up by Toronto Nationals in the 2011 supplemental draft.

Statistics

Johns Hopkins University

See also
 Lacrosse in Pennsylvania
 2007 NCAA Division I Men's Lacrosse Championship

References

American lacrosse players
Johns Hopkins Blue Jays men's lacrosse players
1987 births
Living people
People from Springfield Township, Delaware County, Pennsylvania
Sportspeople from Delaware County, Pennsylvania